This is a list of FIPS 10-4 region codes from J-L, using a standardized name format, and cross-linking to articles.

On September 2, 2008, FIPS 10-4 was one of ten standards withdrawn by NIST as a Federal Information Processing Standard. The list here is the last version of codes. For earlier versions, see link below.

JA: Japan

JM: Jamaica

JO: Jordan

KE: Kenya

KG: Kyrgyzstan

KN: North Korea

KR: Kiribati

KS: South Korea

KU: Kuwait

KZ: Kazakhstan

LA: Laos

LE: Lebanon

LG: Latvia

LH: Lithuania

LI: Liberia

LO: Slovakia

LS: Liechtenstein

LT: Lesotho

LU: Luxembourg

LY: Libya 
This list of codes for Libya is based upon the 1988–1995 baladiyat subdivision of Libya. The first level subdivisions of Libya have changed several times since then. See Districts of Libya.

See also
 List of FIPS region codes (A-C)
 List of FIPS region codes (D-F)
 List of FIPS region codes (G-I)
 List of FIPS region codes (M-O)
 List of FIPS region codes (P-R)
 List of FIPS region codes (S-U)
 List of FIPS region codes (V-Z)

Sources
 FIPS 10-4 Codes and history
 Last version of codes
 All codes (include earlier versions)
 Table to see the evolution of the codes over time
 Administrative Divisions of Countries ("Statoids"), Statoids.com

References

Region codes